
Gmina Młodzieszyn is a rural gmina (administrative district) in Sochaczew County, Masovian Voivodeship, in east-central Poland.

Villages
Gmina Młodzieszyn contains the villages and settlements of Adamowa Góra, Bibiampol, Bieliny, Helenka, Helenów, Janów, Januszew, Juliopol, Justynów, Kamion, Kamion Dolny, Kamion Mały, Kamion Podgórny, Leontynów, Marysin, Mistrzewice, Młodzieszyn, Młodzieszynek, Nowa Wieś, Nowe Mistrzewice, Nowy Kamion, Olszynki, Radziwiłka, Rokicina, Rokiejna, Ruszki, Skutki, Stare Budy and Witkowice.

Neighbouring gminas
Gmina Młodzieszyn is bordered by the town of Sochaczew and by the gminas of Brochów, Iłów, Rybno, Sochaczew and Wyszogród.

References
Polish official population figures 2006

Mlodzieszyn
Sochaczew County